Krty-Hradec is a municipality and village in Strakonice District in the South Bohemian Region of the Czech Republic. It has about 100 inhabitants.

Gallery

References

Villages in Strakonice District